A Bird in a Gilded Cage is a short 10-minute Australian television play. It was one of the rare Australian dramas at the time. It was the first screen credit for Patricia Hooker who in 1960 called it "just a 10-minute Victorian melodrama... but it's a good start and has inspired me to begin another television play - a half-hour effort this time."

Australian TV drama was relatively rare at the time.

References

External links
A Bird in a Gilded Cage at IMDb
Bird in a Gilded Cage' at AustLit

Australian television plays
1957 television plays